"Alapaap" (English: Skies) is a song by the Eraserheads from the album Circus. The song was the band's ninth hit single and the fourth hit single from the album. The song has been covered by 6cyclemind twice (in 2005 with Ney Dimaculangan and 2012 with Tutti Caringal). The song starts with a bass riff by Buddy Zabala

Controversy
Senator Tito Sotto called for the banning of "Alapaap" from airplay, claiming that the song promotes illegal drugs  The band, however, replied to the allegations through a letter to the lawmaker.

Performances
The band performed the song in their historical reunion concert last August 30, 2008 as an opening song.

The band last performed the song in their Final Set concert last March 7, 2009 wherein they played the song in a different rendition.

Notes
As the band are heavily influenced by international acts, parts of the song interpolate earlier English songs, such as The Lemonheads' "It's a Shame About Ray", Morrissey's "We Hate It When Our Friends Become Successful" and The Pale Fountains' "Reach".
The intro of the song is used as the melody for "Whole Lotta Lovin'", a song by the late rapper Francis Magalona.

Covers
6Cyclemind covered the song from the OPM Various Artist Album, UltraElectroMagneticJam fronted by former vocalist Ney Dimaculangan in 2005, 7 years later, the band covered the song again but it was now vocalized by new frontman Tutti Caringal (formerly from Protein Shake) and duet with Eunice Jorge of the pop rock band Gracenote from the compilation album, The Reunion: An Eraserheads Tribute Album in 2012.
In 2008, comedian Michael V. and a few cast members from the late-night gag show Bubble Gang (known as the "Eraseyourheads") made a parody cover of the song entitled "Hala Pack Up" (English: Oh No, Pack Up). The song's lyrics tell the story of a fan who goes to a concert of a famous band only to find disappointment when said concert had to be cut short. The song also references the first reunion concert of the Eraserheads that year, when front-man Ely Buendia had to be rushed to the hospital, thus ending the reunion concert prematurely.

References

Eraserheads songs
1994 songs
1994 singles
Songs written by Ely Buendia
Obscenity controversies in music
Tagalog-language songs